A Robinson list or Mail Preference Service (MPS) list is an opt-out list of people who do not wish to receive marketing transmissions. The marketing can be via e-mail, postal mail, telephone, or fax. In each case, contact details will be placed on a blacklist.

Examples 
In the United Kingdom, the Mailing Preference Service composes a Robinson list funded by the direct mail industry, which collects names and addresses of people who do not want to receive direct marketing. This list is circulated to marketing companies, which are then responsible for not contacting people on the list.

The Marketing Association of New Zealand maintains the New Zealand Name Removal Service, which allows private individuals to stop calls and mail from its 500 members.

Other Robinson lists include:
 Belgian Robinson list
 British Telephone Preference Service
 Canadian Do Not Call List
 Finnish mailing and telephone preference services
 French liste orange
 Italian Registro Pubblico delle Opposizioni ("Public Registry of Oppositions")
 Spanish Robinson list
 UK Mailing Preference Service
 United States National Do Not Call Registry
 Australian Do Not Call Register

See also
 Direct marketing
 E-mail marketing
 Mailshot
 Opt-out

References

External links
 stopjunkmail.org.uk - Free and independent advice for UK residents on stopping junk mail
 stopjunkmail.co.uk - Free and independent advice for UK residents on stopping postal junk mail
 USA.gov's reference for Telemarketing and Unwanted Mail

Direct marketing
Telemarketing